Andrew James Spence (born May 9, 1983) is a drummer and a founding member of Hard Rock band, Starseed. He performed briefly with New Zealand progressive rock group, Agent and has also performed and recorded with Hip-Hop Crossover band The Spindle Sect. He is also known as Animal Andy from his work as a DJ on UK Based Internet radio station Totalrock which later became Bloodstock Radio.

Bio 

Andrew was born on 9 May 1983 in Johannesburg, South Africa. At the age of 12, Andrew was hit with the drumming bug after a "2 week rebirth" into the world of rock n´ roll when he first heard John Bonham’s work on Led Zepp´s legendary "Achilles Last Stand". “I couldn’t put the CD down” exclaims Andrew, “I would get home from school and ritualistically I had to listen to that song at least 3 times a day and after about 2 weeks of this, my parents lives would change for the “worse” when I said ‘I wanna be a drummer’!”. Andrew was taught his craft at his local church and at the age of 15 won a special award for Best Drummer at one of South Africa´s biggest music competitions. Along with brother Russell Spence (vocals, guitars), Starseed was formed in January 2000 and the band relocated to London (UK) in 2001. Starseed have powered into the UK Music scene since the release of their album "Peace Machine" in Aug 2009 with features in Kerrang! Magazine, XFM live sessions and touring the UK extensively. Highlights of 2010 have included an O2 Academy Summer Tour with rap/rock heavyweights, Senser and slots at Download Festival and Hard Rock Hell IV. More recently Andrew has been playing with Crossover Rap/Rock band The Spindle Sect and recorded their most recent album Bubonic Tronic, released in April 2012.

Andrew currently endorses Tama Drums & Hardware, Sabian Cymbals and Protection Racket.

Hiatus with Starseed 

On 2 May 2012, the band announced that they were taken an indefinite break.

Agent 

Andy joined progressive rock band Agent for a brief period in 2012 and can be seen in their video for "Lunatic" from their album "Kingdom Of Fear".

I Am I 

Filled in for ZP Theart's "I Am I" at Download Festival 2013, playing 2 sets on Sunday 16 June. One of the Jägermeister Acoustic Stage and later that day on the Red Bull Stage.

Discography

With Starseed 

2001 Starseed - ...too short to reminisce
2004 Starseed - Reborn EP
2005 Starseed - All the things they can't take away...
2006 Starseed - Love's War EP
2009 Starseed - Peace Machine

With The Spindle Sect 

2012 The Spindle Sect - Bubonic Tronic

With Ethel My Love 

1999 Ethel My Love - Beautiful (Single)

With Deep Kick 

1998 Deep Kick - Skin EP

References
Andrew Spence and Gerald Gill join Agent on Agentband.com
Vocalist-drummer Andy Spence fills us in on "See Through Your Lies" on Revolver Magazine
Starseed track "Return" featuring  Andrew Spence (drums, vocals) on Loudwire.com

External links
Interview with Russell and Andrew Spence of Starseed on 411 Mania - Feb 2012
Next Mosh interview with Russell and Andrew Spence of Starseed in Feb 2012
Interview with Andrew Spence by Room Thirteen
Animal Andy profile at Totalrock.com website

1983 births
Living people
South African musicians
South African drummers
21st-century drummers